Dietrich Tzwyvel or Theodoricus Tzwyvel (1490–1536) was a German mathematician, typographer and composer.

Life 
Tzwyvel designed the astronomical clock of the Münster Cathedral.

Works

References 

16th-century German mathematicians
German typographers and type designers
1490 births
1536 deaths